Saint Stanislaus Kostka Church is a parish church in Warsaw, Poland, located at Hozjusz Street 2 near Plac Wilsona. It is the most significant church in the Żoliborz district. It is dedicated to St. Stanislaus Kostka, a 16th-century Jesuit.

The parish was created in 1927 in the area on the northern outskirts of city, which was the site of significant development during the interbellum period. Construction on the monumental Neo-Romanesque church building began in 1930, but was interrupted by World War II, and not completed until 1963.

The church is the well-known Sanctuary of Blessed Jerzy Popiełuszko, who was the spiritual leader of Solidarność and was killed by the Communists in 1984. From 1980 he conducted very popular Masses for the Fatherland that became a kind of manifesto for the social movement and protesters, attracting people from all around Poland. This is also the place of his burial, and his grave is situated beside the church. The site was visited by Pope John Paul II in 1987. An estimated 20,000,000 people from over 100 countries have visited.

References

External links
Parafia św. Stanisława Kostki w Warszawie 

Roman Catholic churches in Warsaw
20th-century Roman Catholic church buildings in Poland
Roman Catholic churches completed in 1963
Christian organizations established in 1927